The settlement of the Americas began when Paleolithic hunter-gatherers entered North America from the North Asian Mammoth steppe via the Beringia land bridge, which had formed between northeastern Siberia and western Alaska due to the lowering of sea level during the Last Glacial Maximum (26,000 to 19,000 years ago). These populations expanded south of the Laurentide Ice Sheet and spread rapidly southward, occupying both North and South America, by 12,000 to 14,000 years ago. The earliest populations in the Americas, before roughly 10,000 years ago, are known as Paleo-Indians.  Indigenous peoples of the Americas have been linked to Siberian populations by linguistic factors, the distribution of blood types, and in genetic composition as reflected by molecular data, such as DNA.

While there is general agreement that the Americas were first settled from Asia, the pattern of migration and the place(s) of origin in Eurasia of the peoples who migrated to the Americas remain unclear. The traditional theory is that  Ancient Beringians moved when sea levels were significantly lowered due to the Quaternary glaciation,  following herds of now-extinct Pleistocene megafauna along ice-free corridors that stretched between the Laurentide and Cordilleran ice sheets. Another route proposed is that, either on foot or using primitive boats, they migrated down the Pacific coast to South America as far as Chile. Any archaeological evidence of coastal occupation during the last Ice Age would now have been covered by the sea level rise, up to a hundred metres since then.

The precise date for the peopling of the Americas is a long-standing open question, and while advances in archaeology, Pleistocene geology, physical anthropology, and DNA analysis have progressively shed more light on the subject, significant questions remain unresolved. The "Clovis first theory" refers to the hypothesis that the Clovis culture represents the earliest human presence in the Americas about 13,000 years ago. Evidence of pre-Clovis cultures has accumulated and pushed back the possible date of the first peopling of the Americas. Academics generally  believe that humans reached North America south of the Laurentide Ice Sheet at some point between 15,000 and 20,000 years ago. Some archaeological evidence suggests the possibility that human arrival in the Americas may have occurred prior to the Last Glacial Maximum more than 20,000 years ago.

The environment during the latest glaciation

Emergence and submergence of Beringia

During the Wisconsin glaciation, the Earth's ocean water was, to varying degrees over time, stored in glacier ice. As water accumulated in glaciers, the volume of water in the oceans correspondingly decreased, resulting in lowering of global sea level. The variation of sea level over time has been reconstructed using oxygen isotope analysis of deep sea cores, the dating of marine terraces, and high-resolution oxygen isotope sampling from ocean basins and modern ice caps. With the rise of sea level after the Last Glacial Maximum (LGM), the Beringian land bridge was again submerged. Estimates of the final re-submergence of the Beringian land bridge based purely on present bathymetry of the Bering Strait and eustatic sea level curve place the event around 11,000 years BP (Figure 1). Ongoing research reconstructing Beringian paleogeography during deglaciation could change that estimate and possible earlier submergence could further constrain models of human migration into North America.

Glaciers

The onset of the Last Glacial Maximum after 30,000 years BP saw the expansion of alpine glaciers and continental ice sheets that blocked migration routes out of Beringia. By 21,000 years BP, and possibly thousands of years earlier, the Cordilleran and Laurentide ice sheets coalesced east of the Rocky Mountains, closing off a potential migration route into the center of North America. Alpine glaciers in the coastal ranges and the Alaskan Peninsula isolated the interior of Beringia from the Pacific coast. Coastal alpine glaciers and lobes of Cordilleran ice coalesced into piedmont glaciers that covered large stretches of the coastline as far south as Vancouver Island and formed an ice lobe across the Straits of Juan de Fuca by 15,000 14C years BP (18,000 cal years BP). Coastal alpine glaciers started to retreat around 19,000 cal years BP while Cordilleran ice continued advancing in the Puget lowlands up to 14,000 14C years BP (16,800 cal years BP). Even during the maximum extent of coastal ice, unglaciated refugia persisted on present-day islands, that supported terrestrial and marine mammals. As deglaciation occurred, refugia expanded until the coast became ice-free by 15,000 cal years BP. The retreat of glaciers on the Alaskan Peninsula provided access from Beringia to the Pacific coast by around 17,000 cal years BP. The ice barrier between interior Alaska and the Pacific coast broke up starting around 13,500 14C years (16,200 cal years) BP. The ice-free corridor to the interior of North America opened between 13,000 and 12,000 cal years BP. Glaciation in eastern Siberia during the LGM was limited to alpine and valley glaciers in mountain ranges and did not block access between Siberia and Beringia.

Climate and biological environments

The paleoclimates and vegetation of eastern Siberia and Alaska during the Wisconsin glaciation have been deduced from high resolution oxygen isotope data and pollen stratigraphy. Prior to the Last Glacial Maximum, climates in eastern Siberia fluctuated between conditions approximating present day conditions and colder periods. The pre-LGM warm cycles in Arctic Siberia saw flourishes of megafaunas. The oxygen isotope record from the Greenland Ice Cap suggests that these cycles after about 45k years BP lasted anywhere from hundreds to between one and two thousand years, with greater duration of cold periods starting around 32k cal years BP. The pollen record from Elikchan Lake, north of the Sea of Okhotsk, shows a marked shift from tree and shrub pollen to herb pollen prior to 26k 14C years BP, as herb tundra replaced boreal forest and shrub steppe going into the LGM. A similar record of tree/shrub pollen being replaced with herb pollen as the LGM approached was recovered near the Kolyma River in Arctic Siberia. The abandonment of the northern regions of Siberia due to rapid cooling or the retreat of game species with the onset of the LGM has been proposed to explain the lack of archaeological sites in that region dating to the LGM. The pollen record from the Alaskan side shows shifts between herb/shrub and shrub tundra prior to the LGM, suggesting less dramatic warming episodes than those that allowed forest colonization on the Siberian side. Diverse, though not necessarily plentiful, megafauna were present in those environments. Herb tundra dominated during the LGM, due to cold and dry conditions.

Coastal environments during the Last Glacial Maximum were complex. The lowered sea level, and an isostatic bulge equilibrated with the depression beneath the Cordilleran Ice Sheet, exposed the continental shelf to form a coastal plain. While much of the coastal plain was covered with piedmont glaciers, unglaciated refugia supporting terrestrial mammals have been identified on Haida Gwaii, Prince of Wales Island, and outer islands of the Alexander Archipelago. The now-submerged coastal plain has potential for more refugia. Pollen data indicate mostly herb/shrub tundra vegetation in unglaciated areas, with some boreal forest towards the southern end of the range of Cordilleran ice. The coastal marine environment remained productive, as indicated by fossils of pinnipeds. The highly productive kelp forests over rocky marine shallows may have been a lure for coastal migration. Reconstruction of the southern Beringian coastline also suggests potential for a highly productive coastal marine environment.

Environmental changes during deglaciation

Pollen data indicate a warm period culminating between 14k and 11k 14C years BP (17k-13k cal years BP) followed by cooling between 11k-10k 14C years BP (13k-11.5k cal years BP). Coastal areas deglaciated rapidly as coastal alpine glaciers, then lobes of Cordilleran ice, retreated. The retreat was accelerated as sea levels rose and floated glacial termini.  It has been estimated that the coast range was fully ice-free between 16k and 15k cal years BP. Littoral marine organisms colonized shorelines as ocean water replaced glacial meltwater. Replacement of herb/shrub tundra by coniferous forests was underway by 12.4k 14C years BP (15k cal years BP) north of Haida Gwaii. Eustatic sea level rise caused flooding, which accelerated as the rate grew more rapid.

The inland Cordilleran and Laurentide ice sheets retreated more slowly than did the coastal glaciers. Opening of an ice-free corridor did not occur until after 13k to 12k cal years BP. The early environment of the ice-free corridor was dominated by glacial outwash and meltwater, with ice-dammed lakes and periodic flooding from the release of ice-dammed meltwater. Biological productivity of the deglaciated landscape increased slowly. The earliest possible viability of the ice-free corridor as a human migration route has been estimated at 11.5k cal years BP.

Birch forests were advancing across former herb tundra in Beringia by 14.3ka 14C years BP (17k cal years BP) in response to climatic amelioration, indicating increased productivity of the landscape.

Analyses of biomarkers and microfossils preserved in sediments from Lake E5 and Burial Lake in northern Alaska suggest early humans burned Beringian landscapes as early as 34,000 years ago. The authors of these studies suggest that fire was used as means of hunting megafauna.

Chronology, reasons for, and sources of migration
The Indigenous peoples of the Americas have ascertained archaeological presence in the Americas dating back to about 15,000 years ago. More recent research, however, suggests a human presence dating to between 18,000 and 26,000 years ago, during the Last Glacial Maximum.
There remain uncertainties regarding the precise dating of individual sites and regarding conclusions drawn from population genetics studies of contemporary Native Americans.

Chronology

In the early 21st century, the models of the chronology of migration are divided into two general approaches.

The first is the short chronology theory, that the first migration occurred after the LGM, which went into decline after about 19,000 years ago, and was then followed by successive waves of immigrants.

The second theory is the long chronology theory, which proposes that the first group of people entered Beringia, including ice-free parts of Alaska, at a much earlier date, possibly 40,000 years ago, followed by a much later second wave of immigrants.

The Clovis First theory, which dominated thinking on New World anthropology for much of the 20th century, was challenged in the 2000s by the secure dating of archaeological sites in the Americas to before 13,000 years ago.

The archaeological sites in the Americas with the oldest dates that have gained broad acceptance are all compatible with an age of about 15,000 years. This includes the Buttermilk Creek Complex in Texas, the Meadowcroft Rockshelter site in Pennsylvania and the Monte Verde site in southern Chile. Archaeological evidence of pre-Clovis people points to the South Carolina Topper Site being 16,000 years old, at a time when the glacial maximum would have theoretically allowed for lower coastlines.

It has often been suggested that an ice-free corridor, in what is now Western Canada, would have allowed migration before the beginning of the Holocene. However, a 2016 study has argued against this, suggesting that the peopling of North America via such a corridor is unlikely to significantly pre-date the earliest Clovis sites. The study concludes that the ice-free corridor in what is now Alberta and British Columbia "was gradually taken over by a boreal forest dominated by spruce and pine trees" and that the "Clovis people likely came from the south, not the north, perhaps following wild animals such as bison".
An alternative hypothesis for the peopling of America is coastal migration, which may have been feasible along the deglaciated (but now submerged) coastline of the Pacific Northwest from about 16,000 years ago.

Evidence for pre-LGM human presence

Pre-Last Glacial Maximum migration across Beringia into the Americas is strongly supported by the 2021 discovery of human footprints in relict lake sediments near White Sands National Park in New Mexico, which suggest a human presence dating back to the LGM between 18,000 and 26,000 years ago. This age is based on a well-constrained stratigraphic record and radiocarbon dating of seeds in the sediments. Pre-LGM migration across Beringia has also been proposed to explain purported pre-LGM ages of archaeological sites in the Americas such as Bluefish Caves and Old Crow Flats in the Yukon Territory, and Meadowcroft Rock Shelter in Pennsylvania.

At Old Crow Flats, mammoth bones have been found that are broken in distinctive ways indicating human butchery. The radiocarbon dates on these vary between 25,000 and 40,000 years BP. Also, stone microflakes have been found in the area indicating tool production.

Previously, the interpretations of butcher marks and the geologic association of bones at the Bluefish Cave and Old Crow Flats sites, and the related Bonnet Plume site, have been called into question.

In addition to disputed archaeological sites, support for pre-LGM human presence has been found in lake sediment records of northern Alaska. Biomarker and microfossil analyses of sediments from Lake E5 and Burial Lake in suggest human presence in eastern Beringia as early as 34,000 years ago. These analyses are indeed compelling in that they corroborate the inferences made from the Bluefish Cave and Old Crow Flats sites.

In 2020, evidence emerged for a new pre-LGM site in North-Central Mexico. Chiquihuite cave, an archaeological site in Zacatecas State, has been dated to 26,000 years BP based on numerous lithic artefacts discovered there.

Pre-LGM human presence in South America rests partly on the chronology of the controversial Pedra Furada rock shelter in Piauí, Brazil. A 2003 study dated evidence for the controlled use of fire to before 40,000 years ago. Additional evidence has been adduced from the morphology of Luzia Woman fossil, which was described as Australo-Melanesian. This interpretation was challenged in a 2003 review which concluded the features in question could also have arisen by genetic drift. In November 2018, scientists of the University of São Paulo and Harvard University released a study that contradicts the alleged Australo-Melanesian origin of Luzia. Using DNA sequencing, the results showed that Luzia's ancestry was entirely native.

The ages of the earliest positively identified artifacts at the Meadowcroft site are safely within the post-LGM period (13.8k–18.5k cal years BP).

Stones described as probable tools, hammerstones and anvils, have been found in southern California, at the Cerutti Mastodon site, that are associated with a mastodon skeleton which appeared to have been processed by humans. The mastodon skeleton was dated by thorium-230/uranium radiometric analysis, using diffusion–adsorption–decay dating models, to 130.7 ± 9.4 thousand years ago. No human bones were found and expert reaction was mixed;  claims of tools and bone processing were called "not plausible" by Prof. Tom Dillehay.

The Yana River Rhino Horn site (RHS) has dated human occupation of eastern Arctic Siberia to 27k 14C years BP (31.3k cal years BP). That date has been interpreted by some as evidence that migration into Beringia was imminent, lending credence to occupation of Beringia during the LGM. However, the Yana RHS date is from the beginning of the cooling period that led into the LGM. A compilation of archaeological site dates throughout eastern Siberia suggest that the cooling period caused a retreat of humans southwards. Pre-LGM lithic evidence in Siberia indicate a settled lifestyle that was based on local resources, while post-LGM lithic evidence indicate a more migratory lifestyle.

The oldest archaeological sites on the Alaskan side of Beringia date to 12k 14C years BP (14k cal years BP). It is possible that a small founder population had entered Beringia before that time. However, archaeological sites that date closer to the LGM on either the Siberian or the Alaskan side of Beringia are lacking. Biomarker and microfossil analyses of sediments from Lake E5 and Burial Lake in northern Alaska suggest human presence in eastern Beringia as early as 34,000 years ago. These sedimentary analyses have been suggested to be the only possibly recoverable remnants of humans living in Alaska during the last Glacial period.

The Clovis-first advocates have not accepted the veracity of these findings. In 2022, they said, "The oldest evidence for archaeological sites in the New World with large numbers of artifacts occurring in discrete and minimally disturbed stratigraphic contexts occur in eastern Beringia between 13,000 and 14,200 BP. South of the ice sheets, the oldest such sites occur in association with the Clovis complex. If humans managed to breach the continental ice sheets significantly before 13,000 BP, there should be clear evidence for it in the form of at least some stratigraphically discrete archaeological components with a relatively high artifact count. So far, no such evidence exists."

Genomic age estimates

Genetic studies have used high resolution analytical techniques applied to DNA samples from modern Native Americans and Asian populations regarded as their source populations to reconstruct the development of human Y-chromosome DNA haplogroups (yDNA haplogroups) and human mitochondrial DNA haplogroups (mtDNA haplogroups) characteristic of Native American populations. Models of molecular evolution rates were used to estimate the ages at which Native American DNA lineages branched off from their parent lineages in Asia and to deduce the ages of demographic events. One model (Tammetal 2007) based on Native American mtDNA Haplotypes (Figure 2) proposes that migration into Beringia occurred between 30k and 25k cal years BP, with migration into the Americas occurring around 10k to 15k years after isolation of the small founding population. Another model (Kitchen et al. 2008) proposes that migration into Beringia occurred approximately 36k cal years BP, followed by 20k years of isolation in Beringia. A third model (Nomatto et al. 2009) proposes that migration into Beringia occurred between 40k and 30k cal years BP, with a pre-LGM migration into the Americas followed by isolation of the northern population following closure of the ice-free corridor. Evidence of  Australo-Melanesians admixture in Amazonian populations was found  by Skoglund and Reich (2016).

A study of the diversification of mtDNA Haplogroups C and D from southern Siberia and eastern Asia, respectively, suggests that the parent lineage (Subhaplogroup D4h) of Subhaplogroup D4h3, a lineage found among Native Americans and Han Chinese, emerged around 20k cal years BP, constraining the emergence of D4h3 to post-LGM. Age estimates based on Y-chromosome micro-satellite diversity place origin of the American Haplogroup Q1a3a (Y-DNA) at around 10k to 15k cal years BP. Greater consistency of DNA molecular evolution rate models with each other and with archaeological data may be gained by the use of dated fossil DNA to calibrate molecular evolution rates.

Megafaunal Migrations 
Although there is no archaeological evidence that can be used to direct support a coastal migration route during the Last Glacial Maximum, genetic analysis has been used to support this thesis. In addition to human genetic lineage, megafaunal DNA linage can be used to trace movements of megafauna – large mammalian – as well as the early human groups who hunted them.

Bison, a type of megafauna, have been identified as an ideal candidate for the tracing of human migrations out of Europe because of both their abundance in North America as well as being one of the first megafauna for which ancient DNA was used to trace patterns of population movement. Unlike other types of fauna that moved between the Americas and Eurasia (mammoths, horses, and lions), Bison survived the North American extinction event that occurred at the end of the Pleistocene. Their genome, however, contains evidence of a bottleneck – something that can be used to test hypothesis on migrations between the two continents. Early human groups were largely nomadic, relying on following food sources for survival. Mobility was part of what made humans successful. As nomadic groups, early humans likely followed the food from Eurasia to the Americas – part of the reason why tracing megafaunal DNA is so helpful for garnering insight to these migratory patterns.

The grey wolf originated in the Americas and migrated into Eurasia prior to the Last Glacial Maximum – during which it was believed that remaining populations of the grey wolf residing in North America faced extinction and were isolated from the rest of the population. This, however, may not be the case. Radiocarbon dating of ancient grey wolf remains found in permafrost deposits in Alaska show a continuous exchange of population from 12,500 radiocarbon years BP to beyond radiocarbon dating capabilities. This indicates that there was viable passage for grey wolf populations to exchange between the two continents.

These faunas' ability to exchange populations during the period of the Last Glacial Maximum along with genetic evidence found from early human remains in the Americas provides evidence to support pre-Clovis migrations into the Americas.

Source populations

There is general agreement among anthropologists that the source populations for the migration into the Americas originated from an area somewhere east of the Yenisei River (Russian Far East). The common occurrence of the mtDNA Haplogroups A, B, C, and D among eastern Asian and Native American populations has long been recognized, along with the presence of haplogroup X. As a whole, the greatest frequency of the four Native American associated haplogroups occurs in the Altai-Baikal region of southern Siberia. Some subclades of C and D closer to the Native American subclades occur among Mongolian, Amur, Japanese, Korean, and Ainu populations.

A 2019 study suggested that Native Americans are the closest living relatives to 10,000-year-old fossils found near the Kolyma River in northeastern Siberia.

Evidence from full genomic studies suggests that the first people in the Americas diverged from Ancient East Asians about 36,000 years ago and expanded northwards into Siberia, where they encountered and interacted with a different Paleolithic Siberian population (known as Ancient North Eurasians), giving rise to both Paleosiberian peoples and Ancient Native Americans, which later migrated towards the Beringian region, became isolated from other populations, and subsequently populated the Americas.

Human genomic models

The development of high-resolution genomic analysis has provided opportunities to further define Native American subclades and narrow the range of Asian subclades that may be parent or sister subclades. For example, the broad geographic range of haplogroup X has been interpreted as allowing the possibility of a western Eurasian, or even a European source population for Native Americans, as in the Solutrean hypothesis, or suggesting a pre-LGM migration into the Americas. 
The analysis of an ancient variant of haplogroup X among aboriginals of the Altai region indicates common ancestry with the European strain rather than descent from the European strain. Further division of X subclades has allowed identification of subhaplogroup X2a, which is regarded as specific to Native Americans. 
With further definition of subclades related to Native American populations, the requirements for sampling Asian populations to find the most closely related subclades grow more specific. Subhaplogroups D1 and D4h3 have been regarded as Native American specific based on their absence among a large sampling of populations regarded as potential descendants of source populations, over a wide area of Asia. Among the 3,764 samples, the Sakhalin–lower Amur region was represented by 61 Oroks. In another study, Subhaplogroup D1a has been identified among the Ulchis of the lower Amur River region (4 among 87 sampled, or 4.6%), along with Subhaplogroup C1a (1 among 87, or 1.1%). Subhaplogroup C1a is regarded as a close sister clade of the Native American Subhaplogroup C1b.

Subhaplogroup D1a has also been found among ancient Jōmon skeletons from Hokkaido The modern Ainu are regarded as descendants of the Jōmon. The occurrence of the Subhaplogroups D1a and C1a in the lower Amur region suggests a source population from that region distinct from the Altai-Baikal source populations, where sampling did not reveal those two particular subclades. The conclusions regarding Subhaplogroup D1 indicating potential source populations in the lower Amur and Hokkaido areas stand in contrast to the single-source migration model.

Subhaplogroup D4h3 has been identified among Han Chinese. Subhaplogroup D4h3 from China does not have the same geographic implication as Subhaplotype D1a from Amur-Hokkaido, so its implications for source models are more speculative. Its parent lineage, Subhaplotype D4h, is believed to have emerged in east Asia, rather than Siberia, around 20k cal years BP. Subhaplogroup D4h2, a sister clade of D4h3, has also been found among Jōmon skeletons from Hokkaido. D4h3 has a coastal trace in the Americas. A study  published in July 2022 suggested that people in southern China may have contributed to the Native American gene pool, based on the discovery and DNA analysis of 14,000-year-old human fossils.

The contrast between the genetic profiles of the Hokkaido Jōmon skeletons and the modern Ainu illustrates another uncertainty in source models derived from modern DNA samples:

The descendants of source populations with the closest relationship to the genetic profile from the time when differentiation occurred are not obvious. Source population models can be expected to become more robust as more results are compiled, the heritage of modern proxy candidates becomes better understood, and fossil DNA in the regions of interest is found and considered.

HTLV-1 genomics
The Human T cell Lymphotrophic Virus 1 (HTLV-1) is a virus transmitted through exchange of bodily fluids and from mother to child through breast milk. The mother-to-child transmission mimics a hereditary trait, although such transmission from maternal carriers is less than 100%. The HTLV virus genome has been mapped, allowing identification of four major strains and analysis of their antiquity through mutations. The highest geographic concentrations of the strain HLTV-1 are in sub-Saharan Africa and Japan. In Japan, it occurs in its highest concentration on Kyushu. It is also present among African descendants and native populations in the Caribbean region and South America. It is rare in Central America and North America. Its distribution in the Americas has been regarded as due to importation with the slave trade.

The Ainu have developed antibodies to HTLV-1, indicating its endemicity to the Ainu and its antiquity in Japan. A subtype "A" has been defined and identified among the Japanese (including Ainu), and among Caribbean and South American isolates. A subtype "B" has been identified in Japan and India. In 1995, Native Americans in coastal British Columbia were found to have both subtypes A and B. Bone marrow specimens from an Andean mummy about 1500 years old were reported to have shown the presence of the A subtype. The finding ignited controversy, with contention that the sample DNA was insufficiently complete for the conclusion and that the result reflected modern contamination. However, a re-analysis indicated that the DNA sequences were consistent with, but not definitely from, the "cosmopolitan clade" (subtype A). The presence of subtypes A and B in the Americas is suggestive of a Native American source population related to the Ainu ancestors, the Jōmon.

Physical anthropology
Paleo-Indian skeletons in the Americas such as Kennewick Man (Washington State), Hoya Negro skeleton (Yucatán), Luzia Woman and other skulls from the Lagoa Santa site (Brazil), Buhl Woman (Idaho), Peñon Woman III, two skulls from the Tlapacoya site (Mexico City), and 33 skulls from Baja California have exhibited certain craniofacial traits distinct from most modern Native Americans, leading physical anthropologists to posit an earlier "Paleoamerican" population wave. The most basic measured distinguishing trait is the dolichocephaly of the skull. Some modern isolated populations such as the Pericúes of Baja California and the Fuegians of Tierra del Fuego exhibit that same morphological trait.

Other anthropologists advocate an alternative hypothesis that evolution of an original Beringian phenotype gave rise to a distinct morphology that was similar in all known Paleoamerican skulls, followed by later convergence towards the modern Native American phenotype.

Archaeogenetic studies do not support a two-wave model or the Paleoamerican hypothesis of an Australo-Melanesian origin, and firmly assign all Paleo-Indians and modern Native Americans to one ancient population that entered the Americas in a single migration from Beringia. Only in one ancient specimen (Lagoa Santa) and a few modern populations in the Amazon region, a small Australasian ancestry component of c. 3% was detected, which remains unexplained by the current state of research, but may be explained by the presence of the more basal Tianyuan-related ancestry, a deep East Asian lineage which did not directly contribute to modern East Asians but may have contributed to the ancestors of Native Americans in Siberia, as such ancestry is also found among previous Paleolithic Siberians (Ancient North Eurasians).

A report published in the American Journal of Physical Anthropology in January 2015 reviewed craniofacial variation focusing on differences between early and late Native Americans and explanations for these based on either skull morphology or molecular genetics. Arguments based on molecular genetics have in the main, according to the authors, accepted a single migration from Asia with a probable pause in Beringia, plus later bi-directional gene flow. Some studies focusing on craniofacial morphology have previously argued that Paleoamerican remains have been described as closer to Australo-Melanesians and Polynesians than to the modern series of Native Americans, suggesting two entries into the Americas, an early one occurring before a distinctive East Asian morphology developed (referred to in the paper as the "Two Components Model"). Another "third model", the "Recurrent Gene Flow" (RGF) model, attempts to reconcile the two, arguing that circumarctic gene flow after the initial migration could account for morphological changes. It specifically re-evaluates the original report on the Hoya Negro skeleton which supported the RGF model, the authors disagreed with the original conclusion which suggested that the skull shape did not match those of modern Native Americans, arguing that the "skull falls into a subregion of the morphospace occupied by both Paleoamericans and some modern Native Americans."

Archaeogenetic and anthropologic data from 2022 concluded that Paleoamericans originated from a source population in Beringia, which has roots in Southern China during the Paleolithic. Ancestors of Native Americans and Indigenous peoples of Siberia diverged from Ancient East Asians ~35,000 years ago and migrated northwards, assimilating previous "Paleolithic Siberians" (Ancient North Eurasian). Although some samples show distinctive morphological traits, they fall within a wider East Asian cluster, including the ~40,000 BC year old Tianyuan man sample.

Stemmed points

Stemmed points are a lithic technology distinct from Beringian and Clovis types. They have a distribution ranging from coastal east Asia to the Pacific coast of South America. The emergence of stemmed points has been traced to Korea during the upper Paleolithic. The origin and distribution of stemmed points have been interpreted as a cultural marker related to a source population from coastal east Asia.

Migration routes

Interior route

Historically, theories about migration into the Americas have revolved around migration from Beringia through the interior of North America. The discovery of artifacts in association with Pleistocene faunal remains near Clovis, New Mexico in the early 1930s required extension of the timeframe for the settlement of North America to the period during which glaciers were still extensive. That led to the hypothesis of a migration route between the Laurentide and Cordilleran ice sheets to explain the early settlement. The Clovis site was host to a lithic technology characterized by spear points with an indentation, or flute, where the point was attached to the shaft. A lithic complex characterized by the Clovis Point technology was subsequently identified over much of North America and in South America. The association of Clovis complex technology with late Pleistocene faunal remains led to the theory that it marked the arrival of big game hunters that migrated out of Beringia and then dispersed throughout the Americas, otherwise known as the Clovis First theory.

Recent radiocarbon dating of Clovis sites has yielded ages of 11.1k to 10.7k 14C years BP (13k to 12.6k cal years BP), somewhat later than dates derived from older techniques. The re-evaluation of earlier radiocarbon dates led to the conclusion that no fewer than 11 of the 22 Clovis sites with radiocarbon dates are "problematic" and should be disregarded, including the type site in Clovis, New Mexico. Numerical dating of Clovis sites has allowed comparison of Clovis dates with dates of other archaeological sites throughout the Americas, and of the opening of the ice-free corridor. Both lead to significant challenges to the Clovis First theory. The Monte Verde site of Southern Chile has been dated at 14.8k cal years BP. The Paisley Cave site in eastern Oregon yielded a 14C date of 12.4k years (14.5k cal years) BP, on a coprolite with human DNA and 14C dates of 11.3k-11k (13.2k-12.9k cal years) BP on horizons containing western stemmed points. Artifact horizons with non-Clovis lithic assemblages and pre-Clovis ages occur in eastern North America, although the maximum ages tend to be poorly constrained.

Geological findings on the timing of the ice-free corridor also challenge the notion that Clovis and pre-Clovis human occupation of the Americas was a result of migration through that route following the Last Glacial Maximum. Pre-LGM closing of the corridor may approach 30k cal years BP and estimates of ice retreat from the corridor are in the range of 12 to 13k cal years BP. Viability of the corridor as a human migration route has been estimated at 11.5k cal years BP, later than the ages of the Clovis and pre-Clovis sites. Dated Clovis archaeological sites suggest a south-to-north spread of the Clovis culture.

Pre-LGM migration into the interior has been proposed to explain pre-Clovis ages for archaeological sites in the Americas, although pre-Clovis sites such as Meadowcroft Rock Shelter, Monte Verde, and Paisley Cave have not yielded confirmed pre-LGM ages.

Dené–Yeniseian language family proposal

A relationship between the Na-Dené languages of North America (such as Navajo and Apache), and the Yeniseian languages of Siberia was first proposed as early as 1923, and developed further by others. A detailed study was done by Edward Vajda and published in 2010. This theory received support from many linguists, with archaeological and genetic studies providing it with further support.

The Arctic Small Tool tradition of Alaska and the Canadian Arctic may have originated in East Siberia about 5,000 years ago. This is connected with the ancient Paleo-Eskimo peoples of the Arctic, the culture that developed by 2500 BCE.

The Arctic Small Tool tradition source may have been the Syalakh-Bel’kachi-Ymyakhtakh culture sequence of East Siberia, dated to 6,500–2,800 calBP.

The interior route is consistent with the spread of the Na-Dene language group and subhaplogroup X2a into the Americas after the earliest paleoamerican migration.

Nevertheless, some scholars suggest that the ancestors of western North Americans speaking Na-Dene languages made a coastal migration by boat.

Pacific coastal route

The Pacific coastal migration theory proposes that people first reached the Americas via water travel, following coastlines from northeast Asia into the Americas, originally proposed in 1979 by Knute Fladmark as an alternative to the hypothetical migration through an ice-free inland corridor. This model would help to explain the rapid spread to coastal sites extremely distant from the Bering Strait region, including sites such as Monte Verde in southern Chile and Taima-Taima in western Venezuela.

The very similar marine migration hypothesis is a variant of coastal migration; essentially its only difference is that it postulates that boats were the principal means of travel. The proposed use of boats adds a measure of flexibility to the chronology of coastal migration, because a continuous ice-free coast (16–15,000 calibrated years BP) would then not be required: Migrants in boats 
could have easily bypassed ice barriers and settled in scattered coastal refugia, before the deglaciation of the coastal land route was complete. A maritime-competent source population in coastal east-Asia is an essential part of the marine migration hypothesis.

A 2007 article in the Journal of Island and Coastal Archaeology proposed a "kelp highway hypothesis", a variant of coastal migration based on the exploitation of kelp forests along  much of the Pacific Rim from Japan to Beringia, the Pacific Northwest, and California, and as far as the Andean Coast of South America. Once the coastlines of Alaska and British Columbia had deglaciated about 16,000 years ago, these kelp forest (along with estuarine, mangrove, and coral reef) habitats would have provided an ecologically homogenous migration corridor, entirely at sea level, and essentially unobstructed.
A 2016 DNA analysis of plants and animals suggest a coastal route was feasible.

Mitochondrial subhaplogroup D4h3a, a rare subclade of D4h3 occurring along the west coast of the Americas, has been identified as a clade associated with coastal migration.
This haplogroup was found in a skeleton referred to as Anzick-1, found in Montana in close association with several Clovis artifacts, dated 12,500 years ago.

Problems with evaluating coastal migration models
The coastal migration models provide a different perspective on migration to the New World, but they are not without their own problems: One such problem is that global sea levels have risen over  since the end of the last glacial period, and this has submerged the ancient coastlines that maritime people would have followed into the Americas. Finding sites associated with early coastal migrations is extremely difficult—and systematic excavation of any sites found in deeper waters is challenging and expensive. Strategies for finding earliest migration sites include identifying potential sites on submerged paleoshorelines, seeking sites in areas uplifted either by tectonics or isostatic rebound, and looking for riverine sites in areas that may have attracted coastal migrants. On the other hand, there is evidence of marine technologies found in the hills of the Channel Islands of California, circa 10,000 BCE. If there was an early pre-Clovis coastal migration, there is always the possibility of a "failed colonization".

See also
 Early human migrations
 Genetic history of Indigenous peoples of the Americas
 List of first human settlements
 Population history of Indigenous peoples of the Americas
 Pre-Columbian transoceanic contact theories

References

Further reading

External links

The Paleoindian Database – The University of Tennessee, Department of Anthropology.
 "The first Americans: How and when were the Americas populated?", Earth, January 2016
 Norbert Francis, “Language in the Americas: Out of Beringia” 2021.
"When Did Humans Come to the Americas?" – Smithsonian Magazine February 2013
The Paleoindian Period – United States Department of the Interior, National Park Service
Shepard Krech III, Paleoindians and the Great Pleistocene Die-Off – American Academy of Arts and Sciences, National Humanities Center, 2008.
 – by Spencer Wells – PBS and National Geographic Channel, 2003 – 120 Minutes, UPC/EAN: 841887001267

 
Paleo-Indian period
History of indigenous peoples of the Americas
Last Glacial Maximum